I Feel So Alive is the debut EP by Christian electronic dance music band Capital Kings. The album was released as a digital download on September 25, 2012 and with Gotee Records. The EP contains three songs that were later released on Capital Kings' self titled album and a remix.

Reviews 
In a Jesus Freak Hideout review by Cortney Warner, Warner states "For their first outing, Capital Kings manages to introduce us to who they are as artists and their musical style. If you're a fan of this genre, then there's plenty to love about Capital Kings, but for casual listeners looking for something new, this EP may sound all too familiar if you listen to other artists with a similar sound. Nonetheless, Capital Kings does a solid job on this EP, aside from the unnecessary remix, and we should expect more good things to come from them in the future."

Track listing

References 

Gotee Records EPs
2012 debut EPs
Capital Kings albums